Semchuk is a surname. Notable people with the surname include:

Brandy Semchuk (born 1971), Canadian ice hockey player
Martin Semchuk (1914–2000), Canadian merchant and politician
Sandra Semchuk (born 1948), Canadian photographic artist
Vadym Semchuk (born 1993), Ukrainian footballer